Cindi Cain (born Cindy Churko in Winnipeg, Manitoba, Canada) is a Canadian country music artist. Cain was nominated for Best Country Female Vocalist at the Juno Awards in 1992. Her 1989 single "I Think That I'll Be Needing You" reached the Top 10 of the RPM Country Tracks chart.

Discography

Albums

Singles

References

External links

Canadian women country singers
Epic Records artists
Living people
Year of birth missing (living people)